Vasu Varma is an Indian film director who works in Tollywood.

Career
Vasu started his career as an apprentice in direction for the movie Sakutumba Saparivaara Sametam directed by S.V.Krishna Reddy. Later, he started assisting V. V. Vinayak from his first film Aadhi as an Associate Director and later became a co-director. Right from the first movie of Dil Raju Productions "Dil", Varma has given his support and acted as a backbone to Dil Raju's direction department and has continued to do so. In 2009, Dil Raju gave the first direction opportunity to Varma, to launch a Naga Chaitanya (son of Nagarjuna) in Josh. He also launched another Karthika Nair (daughter of yesteryears star actress Radha) in the same movie. With Josh, he became one of the rare directors who launched two star kids in one movie.

After Josh, Varma got another chance from Raju for his second movie, Krishnashtami.

Filmography

References

External links
 

Film directors from Andhra Pradesh
Living people
People from East Godavari district
Telugu film directors
21st-century Indian film directors
Year of birth missing (living people)
Indian film directors